Mereče is a small village north of Ilirska Bistrica in the Inner Carniola region of Slovenia.

Unmarked grave
Mereče is the site of an unmarked grave from the end of the Second World War. The Railroad Bridge Grave is located on the east side of the railroad underpass, by a bus turnaround point, and contains the remains of a German soldier from the 97th Corps that fell at the beginning of May 1945.

Church
The local church in the settlement is dedicated to the Sacred Heart of Jesus and belongs to the Parish of Ilirska Bistrica.

References

External links

Mereče on Geopedia

Populated places in the Municipality of Ilirska Bistrica